Ahi (lit., My Brother, an acronym for Eretz Hevra Yahadut, lit., Land, Society, Judaism) is a right-wing religious Zionist political party in Israel. Founded in 2005, it was part of the National Union alliance between 2006 and 2008. For the 2009 elections, it ran a joint list with Likud.

History
The party was established on 21 March 2005, when Effi Eitam and Yitzhak Levi split from the National Religious Party during the 16th Knesset. The split resulted from opposition to Zevulun Orlev's faction in the party, after he had refused to resign from the government following its approval of the disengagement plan. The split occurred when Eitam was suspended as chairman of the party after it failed to approve his suggestion to unite with National Union in order to form a large right-wing–nationalist Religious Zionist party.

Eitam and Levi originally named their party the Religious Zionism (Hebrew: הציונות הדתית, HaTzionut HaDatit), but due to objections from the NRP that its name was too broad, a discussion at the party registrar resulted in the party being renamed the Connection Faction (Hebrew: סיעת התחברות, Siat Hitkhabrut). The party's final name listed in the party registry was the Renewed National Religious Zionist Party (Hebrew: מפלגת ציונות דתית לאומית מתחדשת, Miflaget Tzionut Datit Leumit Mithadeshet).

On 1 August 2005, the party joined the National Union alongside Tkuma and Moledet to participate in the 2006 election, and were joined at the last minute by the National Religious Party. The list won nine seats, of which the Renewed National Religious Zionist Party took two.

On 11 November 2007, the party was renamed Ahi. On 23 December 2008, it left the National Union. For the 2009 elections, the party ran a joint list with Likud, with Shalom Lerner taking the 39th place and Edmund Hasin taking the 45th. With Likud winning only 27 seats, neither Ahi candidate entered the Knesset.

The party's registration was maintained until 2019, when it was revived by Eli Ben-Dahan, after he left the Jewish Home, the successor to the National Religious Party. As part of an agreement with Likud, Ben-Dahan contested the April 2019 elections on the Likud list, but split from the party in June to sit as an Ahi MK.

Ideology

In its original guise, the party subscribed to Greater Israel, and supported the Israeli settlement drive in Gaza and the West Bank. It vehemently opposed disengagement from West Bank, but opposed violence and civil disobedience against the IDF, and called to respect the rule of law. The party platform also emphasized the fight against government corruption, and promoted social justice. The movement was supported by Rabbi Shlomo Aviner, who was seen as its spiritual leader, whilst Nobel Prize winner Robert Aumann was the party's scientific advisor.

References

External links
Party history Knesset website 

2005 establishments in Israel
Conservative parties in Israel
Right-wing parties
Right-wing politics in Israel
Orthodox Jewish political parties
Political parties established in 2005
Political parties in Israel
Religious Zionism
Religious Zionist political parties in Israel
Social conservative parties